Scorched is the upcoming twentieth studio album by American thrash metal band Overkill, scheduled to be released on April 14, 2023. It will be the band's first studio album in four years since The Wings of War (2019), making it the longest gap between two studio albums.

Background
Overkill had announced plans to work on the follow-up The Wings of War as early as October 2019. Progress on the album had slowly been taking shape for more than two years, with bassist D. D. Verni having written nine songs for the album by April 2020, and the band began recording it in September. Drum tracks had been finished by that October, and mixing was handled by Colin Richardson, who had previously worked with Overkill in the late 1990s and early 2000s.

The release date of Scorched was postponed on numerous occasions, partly due to the COVID-19 pandemic. The album was intended to be released in April 2021, but it was soon pushed back to the summer or fall of 2021, and then later to early 2022, and finally to the spring of 2023.

Track listing

Personnel

Overkill
 Bobby "Blitz" Ellsworth – vocals
 D. D. Verni – bass
 Dave Linsk – lead guitar
 Derek "The Skull" Tailer – rhythm guitar
 Jason Bittner – drums

References

2023 albums
Overkill (band) albums
Nuclear Blast albums
Upcoming albums